Ilikrina (Greek: Ειλικρινά; English: Truly) is the fifth studio album by Greek artist, Elli Kokkinou. It was released on 22 October 2007 by Sony BMG Greece and certified gold certification, selling 15,000 units, and return to Sony BMG Music from Heaven Music. The album was written by various artists, mainly by Tasos Panagis, and her lead single "Lipame Ilikrina" peaked at number 2 on the Nielsen's Greece Radio Airplay chart.

Track listing

Singles
The following singles were officially released to radio stations and made into music videos, except the song "De Pao Kala", and had good airplay.

"Lipame Ilikrina"
"Lipame Ilikrina" was the lead single released in October 2007 with music video, directed by Giorgos Gkavalos. It became a considerable airplay hit by the end of the year.

"Eisai Oti Thelo"
"Eisai Oti Thelo" was the second single released in February 2008 with music video, directed by Alexandros Grammatopoulos.

"Pes Mou Ena Psema"
"Pes Mou Ena Psema" was the third single released in April 2008 with music video, directed by Alexandros Grammatopoulos.

"De Pao Kala"
"Den Pao Kala" was the fourth and last single released in June 2008.  It was released as a radio single with a remix to radio stations.

Credits

Personnel 
Mohamed Arafa – percussion (tracks: 2, 6, 8, 9)
Romeos Avlastimidis – violin (tracks: 11)
Thanasis Chondros – bass (tracks: 2, 4, 5, 6, 8, 9, 10)
Vasilis Gavriilidis – orchestration, programming, keyboards (tracks: 7, 12)
Kostas Gianniris – backing vocals (tracks: 1)
Thanos Gkiouletzis – violin (tracks: 4, 5, 8, 9, 10)
Giannis Grigoriou – bass (tracks: 7, 12)
Anna Ioannidou – backing vocals (tracks: 2, 4, 5, 6, 8, 9, 10)
Giannis Kifonidis – orchestration, programming, keyboards, guitars, accordion, backing vocals (tracks: 11)
Simos Kinalis – säz (tracks: 6, 8)
Katerina Kiriakou – backing vocals (tracks: 7, 12)
Pantelis Konstantinidis – bouzouki (tracks: 12)
Spiros Kontakis – guitars (tracks: 7, 12)
Tony Kontaxakis – guitars (tracks: 3)
Dimitris Kontopoulos – orchestration, programming, keyboards (tracks: 1)
Alkis Misirlis – drums (tracks: 7, 12)
Andreas Mouzakis – drums (tracks: 2, 3, 4, 5, 6, 8, 9, 10)
Alex Panagi – backing vocals (tracks: 2, 4, 5, 6, 7, 8, 9, 10, 12)
Tasos Panagis – orchestration, programming, keyboards (tracks: 2, 4, 5, 6, 8, 9, 10)
Liana Papalexi – backing vocals (tracks: 1)
Stavros Pazarentsis – clarinet (tracks: 6, 9, 11) / kaval (tracks: 6, 8) / soprano saxophone (tracks: 11)
Christos Pertsinidis – guitars (tracks: 2, 4, 5, 6, 8, 9, 10)
Panagiotis Stergiou – guitars (tracks: 3) / bouzouki (tracks: 3, 4, 5, 9, 10) / cura (tracks: 3, 4, 6, 9) / baglama (tracks: 3, 10)
Pantelis Stoikos – trumpet (tracks: 11)
Leonidas Tzitzos – orchestration, programming, keyboards (tracks: 7, 12)
Charis Varthakouris – orchestration, programming, keyboards (tracks: 3)

Production 
Aris Binis – sound engineer, mix engineer (tracks: 1, 2, 4, 5, 6, 7, 8, 9, 10, 12)
Vasilis Gavriilidis – production manager (tracks: 7, 12)
Panos Georgiadis – photographer assistant
Konstantinos Kagkas – hair styling
Giannis Kifonidis – production manager, sound engineer, mix engineer (tracks: 11)
Savvas Konstantinidis – mix engineer (tracks: 3)
Dimitris Kontopoulos – production manager (tracks: 1)
Vanesa Koutsopodiotou – make up
Tzortzia Michalopoulou – photo processing
Tasos Panagis – production manager (tracks: 2, 4, 5, 6, 8, 9, 10)
Roula Revi – photographer
Petros Siakavellas – mastering
Tasos Sofroniou – styling
Charis Varthakouris – production manager, sound engineer (tracks: 3)

Charts
Ilikrina made its debut at number 2 on the 'Top 50 Greek Albums' charts by IFPI.

After months, it was certified gold according to sales.

References

2007 albums
Elli Kokkinou albums
Greek-language albums
Sony Music Greece albums